Kian Baraftab (also Romanized as Kīān Barāftāb; also known as Kīān-e Soflá) is a village in Zagheh Rural District, Zagheh District, Khorramabad County, Lorestan Province, Iran. At the 2006 census, its population was 186, in 42 families.

References 

Towns and villages in Khorramabad County